London is an unincorporated community in Kanawha County in the U.S. state of West Virginia, located 25 miles from the state capital of Charleston. London Lock and Dam, operated by US Army Corps of Engineers is located here on Kanawha River.

Located in London is the former Booker T. Washington High School, listed on the National Register of Historic Places in 1999. John Wesley Conley (1820–1874), the grandfather of historian Phil Conley, died in London.

References

Unincorporated communities in Kanawha County, West Virginia
Unincorporated communities in West Virginia
Populated places on the Kanawha River